Everest was a French restaurant run by Jean Joho in Chicago for over 30 years. First opened in October 1986, it was located on the 40th floor of 425 South Financial Place, and served Alsatian cuisine.
The restaurant had earned one Michelin star.

It closed at the end of 2020; the COVID-19 pandemic was a cause of its closing.

See also
Les Nomades
Michelin Guide
Charlie Trotter
Alinea
List of French restaurants

References 

Defunct restaurants in Chicago
Restaurants disestablished during the COVID-19 pandemic
1986 establishments in Illinois
2020 disestablishments in Illinois
Restaurants established in 1986
Restaurants disestablished in 2020
French restaurants in Illinois
Defunct French restaurants in the United States